Carla Maria Penz (born October 17, 1961) is a butterfly comparative morphologist and systematist, and the Doris Zemurray Stone Chair in Biodiversity at the University of New Orleans.  Her research also focuses on natural history and behavior, mostly of neotropical butterflies.

Biography
Carla Penz was born in Porto Alegre, Brazil, the first-born daughter of Rubem Paulo Penz and Isolde Renate Penz (née Seth). Through her father’s love for nature and orchids, in particular, she developed an interest in biology from an early age. Penz attended the Jesuit school Colégio Anchieta, where she was also encouraged to pursue a career in science.  As an undergraduate at Universidade Federal do the Rio Grande do Sul (UFRGS), she volunteered at Museu Anchieta, where she started to study butterflies.

Penz obtained her doctorate degree at the University of Texas at Austin.  During that period she traveled to several countries for field and museum work, such as Costa Rica, Panama, Ecuador, Brazil, and England where she spent time at Cambridge University and the Natural History Museum, London. She was funded by the National Science Foundation for post-doctoral work at the DeVries Laboratory at the University of Oregon (1996-2000).  She worked as a Curator of Lepidoptera (2000-2004) and Section Head of Invertebrate Zoology (2003-2004) at the Milwaukee Public Museum in Wisconsin.  Penz joined the faculty at the University of New Orleans in 2004.  She is also a research associate at the American Museum of Natural History and the Milwaukee Public Museum, and an associate professor at PUC-RS, Brazil.

Along with her career, Penz has studied butterfly genetics, natural history, herbivore-plant interactions, wing morphology as related to flight, and phylogenetic systematics. Morphology is the main source of data for her work on phylogenetic systematics, a field of biology that focuses on the evolutionary diversification of living organisms. Penz’s research integrates morphological and evolutionary diversification, and also natural history and behavior of her study organisms.

Selected publications
 Penz, C.M., Casagrande, M.M., DeVries, P.J. & Simonsen, T.J. 2017. Documenting diversity in the Amazonian butterfly genus Bia (Lepidoptera, Nymphalidae). Zootaxa, 4258(3):201-237.
 Pinheiro, C.E.G., Freitas, A.V.L., Campos, V.C., DeVries, P.J. & Penz, C.M. 2016. Both palatable and unpalatable butterflies use bright colors to signal difficulty of capture to predators. Neotropical Entomology, 45: 107-113.
 Penz, C.M., DeVries, P.J. Tufto, J. & Lande, R.S. 2015. Butterfly dispersal across Amazonia and its implication for biogeography. Ecography, 38: 410-418.
 Penz, C.M. & N. Mohammadi. 2013. Wing pattern diversity in Brassolini butterflies (Nymphalidae, Satyrinae). Biota Neotropica, 13(3):1-27.
 Penz, C.M., A.V.L. Freitas, L.A. Kaminski, M.M. Casagrande & P.J. DeVries. 2013. Adult and early-stage characters of Brassolini contain conflicting phylogenetic signal (Lepidoptera, Nymphalidae). Systematic Entomology, 38: 316–333. 
 Garzón-Orduna, I.J., Marini-Filho, O., Johnson, S. & Penz, C.M. 2013. Phylogenetic relationships of Hamadryas (Nymphalidae: Biblidinae) based on the combined analysis of morphological and molecular data. Cladistics (2013), online early DOI: 10.1111/cla.12021 
 Penz, C.M., N. Wahlberg & P. DeVries. 2012. Diversification of Morpho butterflies (Lepidoptera,Nymphalidae): a re-evaluation of morphological characters and new insight from DNA sequence data. Systematic Entomology, 37: 670–685. 
 Greeney, H.F., J. Whitfield, J.O. Stireman III, C.M. Penz & L.A. Dyer. 2011. Natural history of Eryphanis greeneyi (Lepidoptera: Nymphalidae) and its enemies, with a description of a new species of braconid parasitoid and notes on its tachinid parasitoid. Annals of the Entomological Society of America, 104:1078-1090. 
 Penz, C.M., N. Mohammadi & N. Wahlberg. 2011. Neotropical Blepolenis butterflies: wing pattern elements, phylogeny, and Pleistocene diversification (Lepidoptera, Nymphalidae). Zootaxa, 2897:1–17. 
 Zenker, M.M., C.M. Penz, M. de Paris & A. Specht. 2011. Proboscis morphology and its relationship to feeding habits in noctuid moths. Journal of Insect Science, 11(42):1-10. 
 Penz, C.M., T.J. Simonsen & P. DeVries. 2011. A new Orobrassolis butterfly (Nymphalidae, Brassolini): a casualty of habitat destruction? Zootaxa, 2740:35-43. 
 DeVries, P.J., C.M. Penz & R. Hill. 2010. Vertical distribution, flight behavior, and evolution of wing morphology in Morpho butterflies. Journal of Animal Ecology, 79:1077-1085. 
 Garzón-Orduña, I.J. & C.M. Penz. 2009. Phylogeny of Dynastor and Brassolis butterflies (Lepidoptera: Nymphalidae): a tough nut to crack. Zootaxa, 2134:1-22. 
 Penz, C.M. 2009. Phylogeny of Dasyophthalma butterflies (Lepidoptera, Nymphalidae, Brassolini). Insecta Mundi, (0069):1-12. 
 Penz, C.M. 2009. The phylogeny of Opoptera butterflies, and an assessment of the systematic position of O. staudingeri (Lepidoptera, Nymphalidae). Zootaxa, 1985:1-20. 
 Penz, C.M.  2008.  Phylogenetic revision of Eryphanis Boisduval, with a description of a new species from Ecuador (Lepidoptera, Nymphalidae).  Insecta Mundi, (0035):1-25. 
 Penz, C.M.  2007.  Evaluating the monophyly and phylogenetic relationships of Brassolini genera (Lepidoptera, Nymphalidae).  Syst. Entomology, 32:668-689. 
 Austin, G.T., A.D. Warren, C.M. Penz, J.E. Llorente-Bousquets, A. Luis-Martínez & I. Vargas-Fernández.  2007.  A new species of Opsiphanes Doubleday, [1849] from western Mexico (Nymphalidae: Morphinae: Brassolini).  Bulletin of the Allyn Museum, (150):1-20. 
 Francini, R.B. & C.M. Penz.  2006.  An illustrated key to the Actinote from Southeastern Brazil (Lepidoptera, Nymphalidae). Biota Neotropica 6(1):1-46. 
 Penz, C.M. & P. J. DeVries.  2006.  Systematic position of Apodemia paucipuncta (Riodinidae), and a critical evaluation of the nymphidiine transtilla.  Zootaxa, 1190:1-50.

References

Other sources
University of New Orleans Department of Biological Sciences
Carla Penz Web Page
Carla Penz - Research gate
Phil DeVries Web Page
Yanayacu Biological Station & Center for Creative Studies

1961 births
Living people
University of Texas at Austin alumni
University of New Orleans faculty
People associated with the American Museum of Natural History
21st-century American biologists
Brazilian women curators